Gelechia conditor is a moth of the family Gelechiidae. It is found in Russia and Korea.

References

Moths described in 1986
Gelechia